Abdul Rahman Khan was a Member of Parliament of Pakistan representing East Bengal.

Career 
Khan was elected to parliament from East Pakistan as a Muslim candidate. He was a lawyer based in Comilla.

References 

Pakistani MNAs 1955–1958

People from Comilla District